The San Diego River Park Foundation is a 501(c)(3) public-benefit corporation that aims to create a continuous green belt (park) along the 52 mile long San Diego River.

Mission statement
The mission of the San Diego River Park Foundation is to improve the lives of everyone and everything involved with the San Diego River by creating the San Diego River Park. “The vision of the San Diego River Park is a greenbelt from the mountains to the ocean along the 52 mile long San Diego River. This greenbelt is really a trail system and a clean and healthy river system which connects a diversity of parks, open spaces, public places and community facilities spread out along the length of the River.”.

About
The San Diego River Park Foundation was founded in 2001 and is dedicated to conserving the water, wildlife, recreation, culture and, community involved with the San Diego River. The foundation has brought people together throughout all of San Diego County with different volunteer opportunities and events.

In October 2006, the San Diego River Park Foundation was the Watershed Highlight of the Month. The California Watershed Network acknowledged the San Diego River Park Foundation for their five years of restoration projects throughout the San Diego River community.

River Coalition
The San Diego River Park Foundation is an organization involved with the San Diego River Coalition. The River Coalition is a group of organizations that aim to "preserve and enhance the San Diego River, its watershed, and its natural, cultural and recreational resources." There are seventy-eight other organizations involved in the Coalition including:
Surfrider Foundation
Sierra Club
Trust for Public Land
California Native Plant Society
National Audubon Society
I Love a Clean San Diego
San Diego Archaeological Center
The Nature Conservancy
As well as many others.

Programs

Volunteer Programs
Clean and Green Team
Community Enhancement
River Watch
River Ambassadors
River Assessment Field Team
River Rescue

Site-Specific Projects
Eagle Peak Preserve Management
Friends of Santee's River Park
Mission Valley Preserve
Friends of Dog Beach
Friends of Famosa Slough
Friends of Point Loma Native Plant Garden

River Park Creation
San Diego River Park Conceptual Plan
Coalition Work Plan
Discovery Center
San Diego River Garden

River Health and Protection
Top of the River Protection
Watershed Management Plan
Watershed Website

River Spirit
San Diego River Days
One River with Many Stories

Organizations Working with the SDRPF
The San Diego River Park Foundation works with many other organizations, including those in the San Diego River Coalition. The San Diego River Park Foundation also works with local chapters of the Surfrider Foundation, the Sierra Club and, the Trust for Public Land.

References

External links
Official Website
The Trust for Public Land
Sierra Club
Surfrider Foundation

Environmental organizations based in California
Non-profit organizations based in San Diego
Parks in San Diego County, California
San Diego River